Five Songs and a Cover (A.K.A. 4 Stars) is an EP released by Foo Fighters on November 20, 2005. It was exclusively distributed to Best Buy retail stores.

The EP is a collection of b-sides from singles from the band's 2005 album In Your Honor. The title refers to the contents: five original songs and one cover song. The cover song is Cream's "I Feel Free," which features drummer Taylor Hawkins on vocals and Dave Grohl on drums. One song on the album, "Skin and Bones," was released as a b-side to "DOA," and became a popular feature of  Foo Fighters acoustic shows. All songs (with the exception of "I Feel Free") have since been re-released on streaming platforms as part of the EP "01050525".

Track listing
All songs by Dave Grohl, Taylor Hawkins, Nate Mendel and Chris Shiflett, except where noted.

Personnel
Dave Grohl – vocals, guitar, drums on "I Feel Free"
Nate Mendel – bass guitar
Taylor Hawkins – drums, lead vocals on "I Feel Free"
Chris Shiflett – guitar

References

External links
 

Foo Fighters EPs
B-side compilation albums
2005 debut EPs
Covers EPs
2005 compilation albums
RCA Records compilation albums
RCA Records EPs
Foo Fighters compilation albums